Haidar el Ali is a Senegalese ecologist, appointed Minister of Ecology in April 2012. In 2013 he became the Minister of Fisheries. He is also president of the Senegalese Green Party (FEDES).

References

Ecologists
Environment ministers of Senegal
Fisheries ministers of Senegal
Green politicians
1953 births
Living people